Euseius plebeius is a species of mite in the family Phytoseiidae.

References

plebeius
Articles created by Qbugbot
Animals described in 1968